Cyptotrama nivea also known as Cyptotrama niveum is a species of mushroom producing fungus in the family Agaricaceae.

Taxonomy 
It was described in 1989 by the German mycologist Rolf Singer who classified it as Cyptotrama niveum however this is now regarded as an orthographic variant and the species is now called Cyptotrama nivea.

Description 
Cyptotrama nivea is a very small snow white mushroom with white, unchanging flesh.

Cap: 5mm wide and obtusely convex. The surface is snow white and finely frosted (pruinose) or finely hairy/woolly (sub-tomentose). Gills: Subdecurrent to decurrent, moderately crowded and white. Stem: 1.6cm wide and 1.3mm thick, running equally along the length. The surface is white with a silky, downy coating and a tomentose base. Spores: Ellipsoidal, smooth, hyaline, non-amyloid. 10.5-16.8 x 6.7-9.3 μm. Basidia: 25-31 x 8-13 μm. Four spored. Smell: Indistinct.

Etymology 
The specific epithet nivea or niveum derives from the Latin niveus meaning as white as snow.

Habitat and distribution 
The specimens studied by Singer were found growing solitary on fallen leaves in Igapó forests along the Igarapé Tarumãzinho river in Brazil.

References 

Agaricaceae
Fungi described in 1989
Fungi of South America
Taxa named by Rolf Singer